The 1952 Delaware gubernatorial election was held on November 4, 1952.

Incumbent Democratic Governor Elbert N. Carvel was defeated by Republican nominee J. Caleb Boggs, who won 52.11% of the vote.

Nominations
Nominations were made by party conventions.

Democratic nomination
The Democratic convention was held on August 26 at Dover.

Candidate
Elbert N. Carvel, incumbent Governor, by acclamation

Republican nomination
The Republican convention was held on August 20 at Dover.

Candidate
J. Caleb Boggs, U.S. Representative for the at-large district, by acclamation

General election

Results

References

Bibliography
 
 

1952
Delaware
Gubernatorial
November 1952 events in the United States